The Mirning, also known as the Ngandatha, are an Aboriginal Australian people whose traditional lands lay on the coastal region of the Great Australian Bight extending from Western Australia into south-west South Australia.

Name
Mirniŋ was their name for 'man'.

Language

Mirning was, properly speaking, a language known as Ngandatha, bearing the sense of "What is it?".

Country
Their northern limit was generally the ecological line separating them from the beginning of the karst plateau of the Nullarbor Plain, though good rains would see them penetrating further north.

People and history of contact
The Mirning were, according to measurements made of old people from a remnant of the tribe in 1939, relatively short in stature and practice rites of circumcision and subincision.

The Jirkala-mirning were first contacted by whites in 1872, when their numbers were estimated to be 30, consisting of 11 men, 8 women, 5 adolescents, and 6 children. It was estimated by the first whites who settled in Wonunda-mirnung territory in 1877 that they numbered no more than 80 persons, 15 men, 15 women, 10 adolescents, and some 40 children. Writing in 1931, A. P. Elkin stated: 'The Wanbiri-speaking tribe, referred to as the Yerkla-mining (that is, the men at Yerkla or Irgala) is now extinct.'

Social organisation
The Mirning were organised into groups of which two at least are known.
 Wonunda-mirnung meaning the people of Hampton plateau west of Wonunda, or Eyre's Sand Patch
 Jirkala-mirning meaning the people of Jirkala (modern day Eucla), jirkala referring, according to Tindale, to their habitat, which was a treeless plain where Salsola tragus or buckbush thrived.

For ceremonial rites, involving the tribe's adoption of circumcision and subincision, the Wonunda-mirnung and Jirkala-mirning would gather at Jadjuuna, just south of Cocklebiddy.

Their kinship system has four classes:-
Būdera (root), Būdū (digger), Kūra, (dingo) and Wenŭng (wombat).

Alfred William Howitt describes the tribe's marriage system as "very peculiar", in which two classes (Būdera and Kūra) have a privileged position as follows:

Heritage damage
In December 2022 it was reported that the 30,000 year old  artwork lining the Koonalda Cave  at  Nullarbor, sacred to the Mirning, was severely damaged by vandals who wrote graffiti over part of the surface.

In film
In April 1994 Julian Lennon proposed making a documentary film with the provisional title Eyes of the Soul – Legends of Whales, Dolphins and Tribes, which would have touched on the Mirnung's cultural relationship to whales.

A documentary called Whaledreamers – the Gathering, which includes mention of the Mirning, was made in 2006.

Alternative names
 Mining, Meening, Minninng, Mininj
 Ngandatha, Ngandada
 Wanbiri (meaning 'sea coast')
 Warnabirrie
 Wonbil, Wonburi. (Kokata exonyms for the Jirkalamirning.)
 Wonunda-meening. (wonunda meaning 'low land(ers)' of Eyre/ south of the Hampton cliff scarp clan)
 Wonunda-minung
 Warnabinnie
 Wanmaraing
 Yirkla, Yirkala-Mining, Yerkla-mining
 East Meening/East Mining
 Ikala, Ikula
 Ngadjudjara
 Ngadjuwonga
 Ngadjadjara
 Julbari/Julbara. (meaning 'south')
 Ba:duk. ( meaning 'circumcised/ignorant' (for lack of total absorption of rites)

Some words
 mobung (magic)
 doodoo/judoo (wild dog)
 mumma. (father) (In the Jirkala-mirning dialect = mummaloo.)
 yarkle. (mother).(In the Jirkala-mirning dialect = yakaloo.)
 wandy-murna (children) (In the Jirkala-mirning dialect = wonderong.).)

Notes

Citations

Sources

Aboriginal peoples of South Australia
Aboriginal peoples of Western Australia